The  is an inactive professional wrestling championship in the Japanese promotion DDT Pro-Wrestling. The title was established in 2018 and was only contested in its inaugural match, on July 22, at Summer Vacation 2018. The belt was sponsored by the Uchicomi! real estate agency.

Title history
Between 2016 and 2018, the real estate agency Uchicomi! was a regular sponsor of DDT Pro-Wrestling. On July 22, 2018, at Summer Vacation 2018, the Uchicomi! Openweight Ultimate Championship was contested in a Scramble Tag Team Rumble Match in which seven teams entered the match in a regular rumble rules match fashion until one team emerged. The victorious tag partners then went on to fight in a regular singles match for the inaugural title. In this second phase of the match, Ken Ohka defeated Gota Ihashi and was presented with the belt by Uchicomi! director Michiaki Nakano.

Since then, the title has never been defended, nor has it been officially deactivated.

Reigns

See also

DDT Pro-Wrestling
Professional wrestling in Japan

References

DDT Pro-Wrestling championships
Openweight wrestling championships